Kushkak-e Kushk (also Romanized as Kūshkak-e Kūshk) is a village in Kushk Rural District, Abezhdan District, Andika County, Khuzestan Province, Iran. At the 2006 census, its population was 2,328, in 434 families.

References 

Populated places in Andika County